Runial, also spelt Ronyal, is a village in Swat District of Khyber Pakhtunkhwa. It is located at 34°58'0N 72°22'0E.

References

Populated places in Swat District